Bicton Castle was a motte and bailey dating from the 11th or 12th century in the hamlet of Bicton, southwest Shropshire, England. Only the ditch and outer bank remain as other parts have been dug away during gravel extraction. The short River Unk runs past it.

Bicton Castle is situated 1.9 kilometer upstream of the larger Clun Castle, in Clun. It is thought to have been held by a minor knight who held the local land in return for duties at Clun Castle. Its prime function was probably as a manorial centre for the flat area of surrounding farmland.

Construction 

Bicton Castle was built by changing a low glacial mount. Although now oval in shape, the motte was likely to have been circular at first, with a diameter of 30 metres. At some point after it was abandoned, the ground was quarried for gravel. Its present-day height is 2.2 metres. A small bailey, 14 by 25 metres, was made by changing the shape of the southern part of the glacial mount.

Bibliography

References

Shropshire